Birch Cove is a summer village in Alberta, Canada.

Demographics 

In the 2016 Census of Population conducted by Statistics Canada, the Summer Village of Birch Cove had a population of 45 living in 20 of its 74 total private dwellings, which represents no change from its 2011 population of 45.

See also 
List of communities in Alberta
List of summer villages in Alberta
List of resort villages in Saskatchewan

References

External links 

1988 establishments in Alberta
Lac Ste. Anne County
Summer villages in Alberta